Barbara Moore, born Anna Cherkasova (22 December 1903 – 14 May 1977), was a Russian-born British engineer who attempted to gain celebrity status in the early 1960s for her long-distance walking and promotion of questionable health fads.

Biography

Moore was among the first generation of Soviet female engineers after the Russian Revolution. In 1932, she became the Soviet Union's long-distance motorcycle champion. She immigrated to Great Britain in 1939, marrying an art teacher, Harry Moore. They later separated. She also used the name Barbara Moore-Pataleewa.

In December 1959, she walked from Edinburgh to London. In early 1960, she walked from John o'Groats to Land's End in 23 days.  She then undertook an 86-day, 3,387-mile walk from San Francisco to New York City, where she arrived on 6 July 1960.

She was a vegetarian and a breatharian, believing it is possible for people to survive without food. She walked with only nuts, honey, raw fruit and vegetable juice for nourishment. In November 1944 the then-new Vegan Society held its first meeting, at the Attic Club, 144 High Holborn, London. Those in attendance were Donald Watson, Elsie B. Shrigley, Fay K. Henderson, Alfred Hy Haffenden, Paul Spencer and Bernard Drake, with Moore observing.

Moore held that people could live to be 200 years old by abstaining from smoking, drinking alcohol and sex. She claimed she had cured herself of leukemia by way of a special diet.

To test her health theories, she planned to build a laboratory next door to her home in Frimley. She was soon drawn into a lengthy legal battle over a sewer and access roads for a nearby housing estate. She spent years and her life savings fighting her case, but ultimately lost in the High Court of Justice. She was jailed for contempt of court after she refused to accept the ruling.

She died in a London hospital on 14 May 1977, bankrupt and near starvation because of her refusal to eat.

Her John o'Groats to Land's End  walk caught the attention of Harry Griffin, who advocated a revival of the Bob Graham Round as possibly a much sterner test of fitness.

References

External links 

 Arrival of British doctor Barbara Moore, vegetarian, (to celebrate Blacktown Centenary with a marathon walk from Albury to Blacktown), Mascot
 Arrival of British doctor Barbara Moore, vegetarian, (to celebrate Blacktown Centenary with a marathon walk from Albury to Blacktown), Mascot 
 Barbara Moore (includes photo of Moore on her John o'Groats to Land's End marathon in 1960)

1903 births
1977 deaths
Inedia practitioners
Pseudoscientific diet advocates
Soviet emigrants to the United Kingdom
Soviet women engineers
Vegetarianism activists
Walkers of the United Kingdom
20th-century women engineers